Tour de Force is the sixth studio album by the southern rock band 38 Special, released in 1983. Three music videos were made for the tracks "If I'd Been the One", "Back Where You Belong", and "One Time for Old Times", with the latter two featuring the band portraying detectives who are, humorously, trying to find a missing woman in a light-hearted homage to the TV drama Hill Street Blues.

Track listing
"If I'd Been the One" (Don Barnes, Jeff Carlisi, Larry Steele, Donnie Van Zant) – 3:55
"Back Where You Belong" (Gary O'Connor) – 4:29
"One Time for Old Times" (O'Connor) – 4:32
"See Me in Your Eyes" (Barnes, Carlisi, Steele) – 3:54
"Twentieth Century Fox" (Barnes, Carlisi, Steele, Van Zant) – 3:45
"Long Distance Affair" (Barnes, Steele, Van Zant) – 3:56
"I Oughta Let Go" (Steve Diamond, Troy Seals, Eddie Setser) – 3:59
"One of the Lonely Ones" (Barnes, Steele, Van Zant) – 4:01
"Undercover Lover" (Carlisi, Steele, Van Zant) – 4:11

Personnel

.38 Special 
 Don Barnes – guitars, lead vocals (1, 2, 4, 5, 6, 8), backing vocals
 Jeff Carlisi – guitars, steel guitar
 Larry Junstrom – bass
 Steve Brookins – drums
 Jack Grondin – drums
 Donnie Van Zant – lead vocals (3, 5, 7, 9), backing vocals

Additional musicians 
 Steve McRay – keyboards 
 Jimmy Markham – harmonica
 Carol Bristow – backing vocals
 Lu Moss – backing vocals

Production 
 Don Barnes – co- producer 
 Jeff Carlisi – co-producer 
 Rodney Mills – producer, engineer 
 Ric Saunders – engineer 
 Bob Ludwig – mastering 
 A&M Mastering Studios (Hollywood, California) – mastering location 
 Mark Spector – management, direction 
 Larry Steele – stage manager 
 Chuck Beeson – art direction, design 
 Norman Moore – art direction, design 
 Harrison Funk – inner sleeve photography 
 Steve Prezant – front cover photography

Charts
Album – Billboard (United States)

Singles – Billboard (United States)

Notes 

38 Special (band) albums
1984 albums
A&M Records albums
Albums produced by Rodney Mills